"Sejodioto"  (Spanish acronym for "Everything Got Screwed") is a song by Colombian singer-songwriter Karol G. It was written by Karol G, J Quiles, Lenny Tavárez, Cristián Salazar and Ovy On The Drums, and produced by the latter. The song was released on September 21, 2021 through Universal Music Latino.

Background 

The song was announced hours prior to its official release on September 21, 2021 through Karol G’s social media accounts. It was released that same day.

"Sejodioto" is an acronym short for "Se jodió todo", Spanish for "Everything got screwed".

Critical reception 

Billboard stated: "The track is an infectious hard-hitting reggeaton fused with Karol's melodious voice and a distinct clock-ticking sound. In true Karol G fashion, "Sejodioto" is a female anthem about a woman who’s enjoying every second of her freedom without commitments."

Commercial performance 

"Sejodioto" debuted at number 42 on the US Billboard Hot Latin Songs chart dated October 2, 2021. On it’s nineteenth week, the song entered the top 15. On it’s twentieth week, the song entered the top 10 and reached its final peak at number 9 on the chart dated February 12, 2022.

Music video 

The music video for "Sejodioto" was directed by Colin Tilley and was released on Karol G’s YouTube channel on September 21, 2021.

Charts

Weekly charts

Year-end charts

Certifications

References

2021 songs
2021 singles
Karol G songs
Songs written by Justin Quiles
Spanish-language songs